Bronisława Orawiec-Löffler (16 February 1929 in Poronin – 10 April 2010) was a Polish activist and dentist.

She died in the 2010 Polish Air Force Tu-154 crash near Smolensk on 10 April 2010. She was posthumously awarded the Order of Polonia Restituta.

References

1929 births
2010 deaths
Polish activists
Polish dentists
Knights of the Order of Polonia Restituta
Recipients of the Silver Cross of Merit (Poland)
Victims of the Smolensk air disaster
20th-century dentists